Kirtland's snake (Clonophis kirtlandii) is a threatened or endangered (depending on location) North American species of nonvenomous snake of the subfamily Natricinae, of the family Colubridae. It is the only species in the genus Clonophis.

Etymology
The specific name, kirtlandii, is in honor of Dr. Jared Potter Kirtland, an American naturalist of the nineteenth century. The snake was first identified by Robert Kennicott in 1855. Kennicott sent a specimen to Spencer Fullerton Baird, the assistant secretary of the Smithsonian Institution, who offered to publish a description of the animal in Kennicott's name. Baird suggested Regina kirtlandii as a scientific name, as Kirtland had been a mentor to Kennicott.

Common names
Common names for C. kirtlandii include: Cora Kennicott's snake, Kirtland's red snake, Kirtland's water snake, little red snake, Ohio Valley water snake, and spread head.

Description
Kirtland's snake is small and slender. Adults reach a total length (including tail) of 12-18 inches (30–46 cm). It is grayish brown with a double series of large black spots down the back, and alternating smaller spots running down each side.  The ventral scales are brick red with a prominent round black spot at each outer end. It has 19 rows of keeled dorsal scales at midbody, and the anal plate is divided.

Geographic range
Kirtland's snake is found in Illinois, Indiana, northern Kentucky, southern Michigan, Ohio, and western Pennsylvania.

Habitat
The preferred natural habitats of C. kirtlandii are forest, grassland, and wetlands such as swamps and marshes. It is almost always found very close to a water source, even though it is less aquatic than water snakes of the genus Nerodia which share its geographic range.

Conservation status
The species Clonophis kirtlandii is listed as endangered in Indiana,  Michigan, and Pennsylvania. It is listed as threatened in Illinois and Ohio, though current research in Ohio is leaning towards the snake being listed as vulnerable.

Diet
Kirtland's snake feeds on primarily earthworms, slugs, minnows, salamanders, frogs and toads.

Defensive behavior
When alarmed C. kirtlandii flattens its entire body to a remarkable thinness, and becomes rigid. Kirtland's snake will also coil up into a disc the size of about a quarter in an attempt to hide from potential threats. If this does not succeed, it will then flee instead of fight.

No person on record has ever been bitten by a Kirtland's snake. This species prefers intimidation, hiding, and fleeing rather than any form of fighting.

Reproduction
Kirtland's snake is ovoviviparous. Females give birth in August and September. Brood size varies from 4 to 22. Each newborn is 13–17 cm (5–6¾ in.) in total length and averages 1.4 gm in weight.

References

Further reading
Behler, J.L., and F.W. King (1979). The Audubon Society Field Guide to North American Reptiles and Amphibians. New York: Alfred A. Knopf. 743 pp. . ("Clonophis kirtlandi [sic]", p. 596 + Plate 551).
Conant, R., and W. Bridges (1939). What Snake Is That? A Field Guide to the Snakes of the United States East of the Rocky Mountains. (With 108 drawings by Edmond Malnate). New York and London: D. Appleton-Century Company. Frontispiece map + viii + 163 pp. + Plates A-C, 1-32. (Natrix kirtlandii, p. 95 + Plate 16, figure 47).
Kennicott, R. (1856). "Description of a new Snake from Illinois". Proc. Acad. Nat. Sci. Philadelphia 8: 95-96. (Regina kirtlandii, new species).
McCoy, C.J. (1980). Identification Guide to Pennsylvania Snakes. (Design and illustrations by Michael Antonoplos). Pittsburgh Pennsylvania: Carnegie Museum of Natural History. 12 pp. (Clonophis kirtlandi, p. 8).
Netting, M.G., and Richmond, N.D. (editors) (1970). Pennsylvania Reptiles and Amphibians. (Photographs by Hal H. Harrison). Third Edition, Fifth Printing. Harrisburg, Pennsylvania: Pennsylvania Fish Commission. 24 pp. (Natrix kirtlandii, p. 3).
Powell, R., R. Conant, and J.T. Collins (2016). Peterson Field Guide to Reptiles and Amphibians of Eastern and Central North America, Fourth Edition. Boston and New York: Houghton Mifflin Harcourt. xiv + 494 pp. . (Clonophis kirtlandii, pp. 410–411+ Plate 40).
Rossman, D.A. (1963). "Relationships and taxonomic status of the North American natricine snake genera Liodytes, Regina and Clonophis ". Occasional Papers of the Museum of Zoology, Louisiana State University (29): 1–29.
Stejneger, L., and T. Barbour (1917). A Check List of North American Amphibians and Reptiles. Cambridge, Massachusetts: Harvard University Press. 125 pp. (Natrix kirtlandii, p. 95).

External links
Michigan state Department of Natural Resources entry
The Center for Reptile and Amphibian Conservation and Management entry

Natricinae
Reptiles of the United States
Reptiles described in 1856
Taxa named by Robert Kennicott